The Nest (released 2003  in Oslo, Norway on the Emarcy (067 153-2)  label) is an album by Norwegian pianist Ketil Bjørnstad, with special guest artist Anneli Drecker, presenting lyrics by the poet Hart Crane (1899-1932).

Reception
The Dagbladet review awarded the album 4 stars, and Amazon.de review 4.5 stars.

Track listing 
«The Nest» (2:40) - Preludium
«In Shadow» (4:20)
«The Window» (3:07)
«The Bridge I» (5:07)
«The Bathers» (4:06)
«The Hope I» (1:36)
«Exile» (3:14)
«The Circle» (4:34)
«Darkland» (2:37)
«Forgetfulness» (4:00)
«The Joy» (3:41)
«The Bridge II» (5:04)
«Old Song» (3:48)
«The Hope II» (5:04)
«The Memory» (4:30)
«Fear» (3:28)
«The Nest» (4:01) - Postludium

Personnel 
Ketil Bjørnstad - piano & synthesizers
Anneli Drecker - vocals
Nora Taksdal - viola
Eivind Aarset - guitars
Kjetil Bjerkestrand - synthesizers, samples & percussion

Credits 
All compositions by Ketil Bjørnstad
Words from the poetry of Hart Crane (1899-1932)
Produced by Ketil Bjørnstad
Recorded at Rainbow Studio, Oslo, Norway, August–December 2002
Engineer - Jan Erik Kongshaug
Additional recordings by Kjetil Bjerkestrand and Peer Espen Ursfjord
Mixed by Jan Erik Konshaug and Ketil Bjørnstad
Mastering by Bjørn Engelmann, Cutting Room, Stockholm, Sweden
Cover Photo - «The Nest», from the series «In the Feminine» by Eva-Maria Riegler
Artist photos - Stian Andersen
Cover design - Deville
Anneli Drecker appears courtesy of EMI Records, Norway

References

External links 
 Ketil Bjørnstad Official Website

2003 albums
Ketil Bjørnstad albums